Archduchess Maria Henrietta, full German name: Maria Henrietta Caroline Gabriele, Erzherzogin von Österreich (10 January 1883, Preßburg, Austria-Hungary – 2 September 1956, Mariazell, Austria) was a member of the Teschen branch of the House of Habsburg-Lorraine and an Archduchess of Austria and Princess of Bohemia, Hungary, and Tuscany by birth. Through her marriage to Prince Gottfried Maximilian of Hohenlohe-Schillingsfürst, Maria Henrietta became a member of the house of Hohenlohe-Waldenburg-Schillingsfürst.

Life
Maria Henrietta was the third child and daughter of Archduke Friedrich, Duke of Teschen and his wife Princess Isabella of Croÿ. She married Prince Gottfried of Hohenlohe-Schillingsfürst, son of Konstantin  Prince of Hohenlohe-Waldenburg-Schillingsfürst of Ratibor and Corvey and Marie Antoinette Princess of Sayn-Wittgenstein-Berleburg, on 3 June 1908 at Baden, Vienna, Austria. She died on 2 September 1956 at age 73 in Mariazell, Austria.

Marriage and issue
Maria Henrietta had three children :

Princess Elisabeth of Hohenlohe-Waldenburg-Schillingsfürst (27 September 1909 – 30 March 1987)
Princess Natalie of Hohenlohe-Waldenburg-Schillingsfürst (28 July 1911 – 11 March 1989)
Prince Friedrich of Hohenlohe-Waldenburg-Schillingsfürst (18 February 1913 – December 1945)

Ancestry

References

1883 births
1956 deaths
House of Habsburg-Lorraine
Austrian princesses